Thalictrum lucidum is a species of flowering plant belonging to the family Ranunculaceae.

Its native range is Europe to Western Siberia and Turkey.

References

lucidum